Aum was a UK unit for hock; it was between 30 and 32 gallons.

It is analogous to the Dutch measure of the same name.

Conversion 

1 aum = 30-32 gallons 

1 aum = 0.136-0.145 m3

References

Units of volume